The Burkinabé Women's Cup is a women's association football competition in Burkina Faso, pitting regional teams against each other. It was established in 2011. It is the women's equivalent of the Coupe du Faso for men.

Finals

Most successful clubs

See also 
 Burkinabé Women's Championship

External links 
 Burkina Faso - List of Women Cup Winners - rsssf.com

Bur
Football competitions in Burkina Faso